Siueni Filimone (born 19 August 1994) is a Tongan sprinter. He competed in the 100 metres event at the 2013 World Championships in Athletics. He competed at the 2016 Summer Olympics. He progressed from the preliminary round with a time of 10.76s, but he did not start in Round 1.

Personal bests

Competition record

1Did not start in the heats

References

External links
 

1994 births
Living people
Tongan male sprinters
Place of birth missing (living people)
Athletes (track and field) at the 2014 Commonwealth Games
Commonwealth Games competitors for Tonga
World Athletics Championships athletes for Tonga
People from Haʻapai
Olympic athletes of Tonga
Athletes (track and field) at the 2016 Summer Olympics
21st-century Tongan people